George Marion McClellan (September 29, 1860May 17, 1934) was an American writer. Born in Tennessee, McClellan was educated at Fisk University and Hartford Theological Seminary. He worked as a Congregationalist minister and as a high school teacher and principal. His writing, generally self-published, included both prose and poetry. Critical assessment of McClellan's work is divided. Some see it as unoriginal, while others  argue that it reveals emotional depth.

Early life and education 
George Marion McClellan was born on September 29, 1860, in Belfast, Tennessee, to Eliza (Leonard) and George Fielding McClellan. 

He received an AB and MA from Fisk University in 1885 and 1890, respectively, and attended Hartford Theological Seminary (now Hartford International University for Religion and Peace) from 1885 to 1887, eventually receiving a bachelor's of divinity in 1891.

Career 

In 1887 McClellan came to Louisville, Kentucky, to work as a Congregationalist minister, later taking a pastoral position in Memphis, Tennessee. Between 1892 and 1894, he worked in New England as a financial agent for Fisk University.

He taught high school and worked as a principal from 1899 to 1919 in Louisville.

Poems, McClellan's first book, was published in 1895 by the African Methodist Episcopal Church and financed with McClellan's money. 

Old Greenbottom Inn and Other Stories (1906) collects almost all McClellan's prose fiction, including a novella, except a story called "Gabe Yowl". All the stories in the collection are about rural Alabama and, except for one, are about Black women. 

Path of Dreams (1916) was published in part to raise funds for McClellan's son Theodore, who contracted tuberculosis. George brought Theodore to Los Angeles, California, to be treated, but he was denied entry to a sanatorium because he was Black and died on January 5, 1917. 

His collections of poetry and prose were generally published privately or self-published, although he also published in periodicals. In total, 67 poems by McClellan are known.

Reception 
Critic Dickson D. Bruce Jr., who considers McClellan's poetry conservative and sentimentalist, notes that it generally treats common themes of the time such as "nature, love, or religion". According to the literary scholar Joan R. Sherman, McClellan's poems illustrate the poetic narrator's "struggle to deal with his 'double consciousness'". In other work, Sherman notes that McClellan "suffered keenly" from double consciousness as a "black artist" who was "highly intelligent, sensitive, ambitious, and race-proud". She describes his work as skillful and measured, while arguing that it evokes "spiritual" dissonance. Sterling Allen Brown "largely dismissed" McClellan's work, viewing it as "the same-old romantic escapism of much of African-American literature".

Personal life 
McClellan married Mariah Augusta Rabb on October 3, 1888. They were probably separated by the 1920s, when McClellan lived in Los Angeles. He died on May 17, 1934, in New York City, and was buried in Louisville.

Publications 
 Poems and Storiettes (self-published in Nashville, Tennessee, 1895)
 Songs of a Southerner (Boston: Rockwell and Churchell, 1896)
 Old Greenbottom Inn and Other Stories (self-published in Louisville, 1906)
 The Path of Dreams (Louisville: Morton, 1916)

Notes

Sources 
 

 

1860 births
1934 deaths
19th-century American male writers
20th-century American male writers
19th-century Congregationalist ministers
20th-century Congregationalist ministers
Fisk University alumni
People from Marshall County, Tennessee